Ledbury Signal Box is a typical Great Western Railway traditional lever frame signal box which remains in daily use at Ledbury Station, Herefordshire, England on the railway line from Worcester to Hereford.

History 
The railway line from Worcester to Hereford opened in several stages, with the section from Malvern to Shelwick Junction, just north of Hereford, opening on 15 September 1861. The current signal box however dates from 1885 opening as the branch line from Ledbury to Newent and Gloucester opened (27 July 1885). It is thought that this current signal box must have replaced an earlier 1861 GWR built signal box, but there is currently no written or physical evidence to support this theory. A recent suggestion has been that the original signal box was just a few metres east of the existing box but the site was covered by new track leading to a redesigned goods yard.  

The current 1885 signal box was built by MacKenzie & Holland of Worcester, as their 'type 3' box design under contract to the Great Western Railway. It has a striking feature in that it is unusually tall, providing good visibility over the goods yard to the east and rear (south) of the 'box. A balcony was also provided on the east side to allow the signalman to communicate with drivers and other personnel working in the goods yard.

Ledbury signal box was designed to be operated by one person and has always provided all the essential modern hotel services such as an office area, heating and cooking.   When the box was built in 1885 this was before the general use of electricity, and at a time when toilet facilities were considered unsanitary and placed outside of dwellings and offices.  Ledbury signal box was built with an open fireplace and chimney, oil lamp lighting, and a separate outside toilet. The fireplace, now blocked off remains as does the chimney and two cast iron oil lamp ventilation ceiling roses, a "modern" toilet has been added in a square wooden extension on the balcony (see second photograph above).

Note that a further signal box named Ledbury Branch Signal Box, was located on the 17.46-mile single line Gloucester-Ledbury branch, 506 yards from the main line junction west of Ledbury station. That signal box opened on 27 July 1885 and closed in 1925 and the branch had closed by 1965.

In March 2013 Ledbury signal box was repainted externally. 
In June 2016 the signal box frame and point connecting rods were renewed increasing the life expectancy of the signal box and reducing the chance of failure

Current Operation 
Ledbury Signal Box is owned and operated by Network Rail a company wholly owned by the British tax payer unlike the station which whilst still owned by Network Rail is served by the private operator West Midlands Trains.

To understand basic railway operation, please see articles on the signalling block system or Understanding the railway block system.

The current method of operation on the section of single line between Ledbury and Shelwick Junction (just north of Hereford) is called "Tokenless Block" and has been since 1986 when that line was singled and the intermediate signal boxes were closed.

The current method of operation on the single line section between Ledbury and Malvern Wells is called "Lock & Block". This is a modified form of Tokenless Block using Great Western Railway equipment that uses the bell telegraph to communicate. This method of operation and equipment, unique to this line, was originally used only through the two single line tunnels on this line, at Ledbury; and under the Malvern Hills between a former signal box at Colwall to the signal box at Malvern Wells. However, with the removal of the second track, the line become singled from Malvern Wells to Ledbury and one long section was created that remains in use today.

To understand the use of tokens on railways, see articles on and what is a token and what is tokenless block.

In line with standard Great Western Railway practice the UP direction is towards London (Paddington). This is the direction from Hereford towards Malvern and Worcester; from West to East.

The DOWN direction is the opposite, from Malvern to Hereford; East to West.

Equipment 

A signal box could be said to be split into two distinct areas, and three operational parts.
Upstairs is the operating floor comprising: 
the work area or office; 
and the social needs area.

Downstairs comprises: 
the frame room.

Operating Floor 
The main entrance to most Lever Frame signal boxes is via a set of stairs to the operating floor, this is usually true regardless of the type of signalling system in use, and is because much of the equipment used to signal trains needs to be held in a room close to, and usually below, the operating floor, the frame room. In some signal boxes these stairs cannot be seen and are constructed inside the building as in the case of local boxes Droitwich, Worcester Shrub Hill, Worcester Tunnel Junction & Evesham. Ledbury has a wooden external staircase that leads from a station platform to the operating floor.

The Operating floor consists of the lever frame itself with the block shelf above, an office area and Social needs facilities.

Office Area 
The office area consists of an office chair and desk, the most prominent feature on which is a book called the Train Register Book (TRB).

Several telephone systems are provided so that signaller can always contact and be contacted by other signal boxes, station staff and operations control and can be contacted by members of the public at level crossings as they require. All telephone calls are recorded for safety and training purposes.

A new additional telephone system was introduced in 2012 with the advent of GSM-R this is a GSM, 3G telephone system that allows signallers to contact the train crew by voice or text and can link into the communication systems used by the British police, fire and ambulance services. A base station aerial for this system was built in 2008 near to the west portal of the Ledbury railway tunnel near the signal box and an additional aerial is located in the roof of the tunnel providing continuous communication inside the tunnel.

A computer is located in the signal box which provides current train running information TOPS and is used to update the actual arrival and departure times of the trains at Ledbury Station, this system helps other signal boxes regulate trains and feeds information to the passenger electronic information displays across the country.

Social Needs Facilities 
Food preparation, cooking and refrigeration facilities are provided so that signallers can prepare drinks and food as one-man operation does not allow for official breaks to be taken at work. Some signal boxes also have little time available to prepare food due to the frequency of trains requiring both eating and toilet breaks to be time managed. Each signal box also contains a table and dining room style chair.  Signallers can be found cooking porridge or bacon for breakfast and making stews, curry, or chilli for tea. Signallers have also been known to bake cakes between trains.

Toilet facilities are also provided, but it is worth remembering that when many of these British lever frame signal boxes were built in the 1850-1910s, household toilets were considered too dirty to be inside a house and were located outside in an outhouse, therefore Ledbury signal box was built with an outside toilet.  This was replaced in the 1960s with an "inside toilet" being constructed on the balcony on the east side. Moreton-in March and Ascot-under-Wychwood signal boxes have a similar toilet but on a balcony next to the top of the entrance stairs, whilst Malvern and Henwick Junction Worcester, just down the line, still retain an outhouse. See news story - Signaller stuck in toilet

In addition the signal box staff have purchased their own lounge easy chair to provide a comfortable place to relax and read between trains.  Historically signallers worked alone and did not get meal or toilet breaks, between trains signallers wash, shave, cook, eat, and keep the signalbox clean.

Frame Room 

Entrance to the Frame Room is from a ground floor door located in the East face of the building. The Frame Room at Ledbury is unusual in that it is arranged on two levels.  The ground floor is around 30 cm below ground with two steps at the door to walk down.

The north wall has some horizontal holes in it next to the track and at sleeper height, these are to enable iron rods that connect to the points and steel cables that connect to the signals to leave the box.  The holes have soft plastic flaps in them to impede access to rats. All lever frame signal boxes have to have these openings and therefore all have visiting members of the rat and mouse population, who live in local drains and water courses. These are usually tolerated because there is little to damage and they very rarely climb up to the operating floor.

Inside there are two parallel mezzanine floors running east to west, one along the north wall and a larger one along the south wall, both reached by two staircases, between each is the level frame itself.

The Lever Frame 

The lever frame is a series of levers contained and interlocked in a frame.  At Ledbury this frame is designed for 41 levers numbered 1 to 41. However, in 1948, following a modification to the track design at Ledbury station, an additional signal lever was added onto the outside of the left (west) end of the frame and, being next to and below number 1 lever, was numbered "0" (zero) - See [ L0 ] below.

Levers work points (aka switch) by means of  lineside guided galvanised steel channel rodding and signals by means of solid or stranded steel wires and the frame itself is very complicated in that it employs a series of horizontal moving locking bars and tappets in order to interlock different levers making it impossible to, for instance, signal a train to run over a point set the wrong way.

In September 1911. the original 41 lever frame interlocking was converted from a GWR double twist to 3-bar vertical tappets (using horizontal trays). Later this lever frame was replaced by a British Rail type, manufactured at Reading Signal Works.

Signals

[ L0 ] Up Main Distant Signal 

Trains from Hereford passed a fixed Distant signal (a yellow, chevroned semaphore) that was bolted, unable to move, to its signal post.  This protected the junction from the branch from Gloucester, Newent and Dymock as this informed drivers to always approach this junction at Ledbury cautiously. When this junction was removed from this track in 1948, this signal now needed to be capable of being operated from the signal box and a new signal and lever were fitted, and with no spare space on the frame, the new signal lever was bolted onto the outside of the frame, to the left of [ L1 ] lever  and given the designation "0". As the signal is a yellow distant signal, the operating lever is painted yellow. In 1956, a colour-light signal replaced the semaphore arm and this remains today.

See: Distant signal

[ L1 ] Up Main Home Signal 

The first red stop signal in the Up direction. Formerly a red semaphore signal, this is now (2013) a three-aspect colour light signal capable of showing Red, Yellow or Green. If all signals ahead in Ledbury (currently [ L4 ] & [ L5 ] are green then this signal will also display green, otherwise Yellow.

See: Home signal

[ L2 ] Up Main Inner Home Signal 

This signal used to protect the Newent branch junction but following track rationalisation in 1948 was no longer needed and removed.

[ L3 ] Up Branch Home Signal 

This signal on the Newent branch used to protect the junction with the main line but following the closure of the branch in 1959 it was removed.

[ L4 ] Up Main Starting Signal 

This signal, still a red semaphore signal is located at the east end of the Up platform and protects the point and entrance to the single line inside the Ledbury tunnel.  Previously there were several points just ahead of it which it also protected.

[ L5 ] Up Main Advanced Starting Signal 

This signal protects the single line inside Ledbury tunnel.  One could suggest that this signal is a duplicate of [ L4 ] and could be removed, but there is a high cost of altering the control systems in line with its removal, and little problem with leaving it in use.  This signal is also a still a red semaphore signal.

Down Signals

See also 
Ledbury Railway Tunnel
Ledbury and Gloucester Railway
Hereford Road Skew Bridge at Ledbury
The Signal-Man, a short story written by Charles Dickens in 1866.
Ledbury Market Town, Herefordshire, England

References

External links 

 A few photographs.
 Railway photographs and history
 Information of signalling.

Signal boxes in the United Kingdom
Rail transport in Herefordshire
Buildings and structures in Herefordshire
Ledbury